Dorothy Davison (9 March 1889 – 4 February 1984) was a British author and medical illustrator, whose work was well known for its artistic merit. She founded the Medical Artists' Association in 1949, and trained many young medical artists in Manchester.

Early life and education 
Little is known about Dorothy Davison's early life, but she enrolled at the Manchester School of Art at around the age of 18. She was forced to leave without any formal qualifications in order to care for her ageing parents. In around 1917, Davison began working at the Manchester Museum, where she taught Egyptology to children and pursued an interest in prehistory. She retained this interest throughout her life, ultimately publishing four works on prehistory.

Career 
At the Manchester Museum, Davison met Sir Grafton Elliot Smith, then a professor of anatomy at the University of Manchester and a prominent Egyptologist. Smith encouraged Davison to pursue a career in medical illustration, recognising her artistic skill and commissioning her to produce anatomical drawings for him. Her first assignment was to illustrate a reptilian brain from over 50 histological sections. She subsequently worked with anatomist Sir John Stopford, and later with Sir Geoffrey Jefferson. Davison worked across a number of different specialities, and with a range of practitioners. She produced illustrations for orthopaedic surgeon Sir Harry Platt, Professor of Anatomy G.A.G Mitchell, and obstetrician Daniel Dougal. She worked particularly closely with Jefferson, a neurosurgeon, and always emphasised the importance of collaboration between artist and practitioner. Davison also produced illustrations for notable publications, including Mitchell's Anatomy of the Autonomous Nervous System and Israel's Atlas of Pathological Haematology. Davison would sketch in the operating theatre, and tidy up her illustrations later.

In 1939, the University of Manchester sought to offer Davison a formal contract as a Medical Artist, but the onset of the war prevented this from happening until 1945. During the war, with less medical work available owing to the altered priorities of practitioners, she spent most of her time working for the University of Manchester's Geography department, drawing and cataloguing maps. In 1945, Davison took up her post at the Manchester Royal Infirmary, where she continued to work until her retirement in 1957. She was very much admired by her colleagues, also achieving a level of international renown.

Davison became particularly distinguished for her use of the 'Ross board technique', developed by Max Brödel while at Johns Hopkins School of Medicine, and introduced to British artists by Audrey J. Arnott. One of the first artists in the UK to employ it, she was, however, skilled in a range of techniques. The Ross board technique was a challenging process, and Davision was an important pioneer. The Ross board technique, also known as the carbon dust technique, involves drawing with a carbon pencil onto a white coated stippled 'Ross board', and building up its three-dimensional form with the application of carbon dust. White paint could then be used to create highlights. Works using the technique form the bulk of the work she undertook for Jefferson during the 1930s–1950s.

Davison always emphasised the capacity of medical illustration to clarify and draw attention to the complex and obscure, as opposed to photographs which could merely copy. In a letter written to the British Medical Journal in 1953, she argued for 'the special province of the artist in research work, reconstruction, and interpretation,' as opposed to that of the photographer:From the early 1940s, Davison trained a large number of aspiring medical artists in Manchester, a condition of her employment at the Royal Infirmary.

Medical Artists' Association 
In 1948, Davison began working to establish the Medical Artists' Association of Great Britain, seeking support from other well-known medical artists. These included Audrey J. Arnott, Margaret McLarty, and Clifford Shepley. The Association's inaugural meeting was held in Oxford on 2 April 1949.

In 1963, the MAA instigated a training scheme leading to a postgraduate diploma. This became the recognised qualification for medical artists in Britain, and remains the most accepted route into the profession.

Writing 
In addition to her career as a medical illustrator, Davison was the author of four works related to the prehistory which fascinated her.

In 1927, Davison published Days and Ways of Early Man, which one review called 'a marked advance in the art of popular presentation of difficult and highly technical matter'. It went on:In 1934, she published Men of the Dawn: the Story of Man's Evolution to the End of the Old Stone Age (part of the Thinker's Library). This was described as an 'excellent little book' which dealt 'with the evolution of the primates up to man and the skeletal remains and culture of Palaeolithic man,' giving special attention 'to the art of the old Stone Age and the recent discoveries in Africa'.

Later years 
Davison retired from her role at the University of Manchester in 1957 but remained active in the Medical Artists' Association. Davison died in Manchester on 4 February 1984.

References

External links 

 Works by Dorothy Davison at WorldCat

1889 births
1984 deaths
English women artists
Medical illustrators
English women writers
People from Manchester
English historians